Palaeochoerus was an extinct genus of even-toed ungulates that existed throughout Africa during the Oligocene, and throughout Eurasia during the Miocene.

References

Prehistoric Suidae
Fossil taxa described in 1847
Miocene even-toed ungulates
Miocene mammals of Africa
Oligocene even-toed ungulates
Oligocene mammals of Asia
Oligocene mammals of Europe
Prehistoric even-toed ungulate genera